Genevieve is a female given name of Germanic or Celtic origin. It may be from the Germanic name  (Latinized as ) meaning "woman of the race".

People with this name
 Sainte Geneviève, French saint (Patron saint of Paris) in Catholicism and Eastern Orthodoxy
 Genevieve Angelson (born 1987), American TV and film actress
 Genevieve Armstrong (born 1988), New Zealand rower
 Genevieve Beacom (born 2004–2005), Australian baseball pitcher
 Geneviève Behrend (1881–1960), French-born author and teacher
 Genevieve Behrent (born 1990), New Zealand rower
 Genevieve Blatt (1913–1996), American judge and politician
 Geneviève Robic-Brunet (born 1959), Canadian cyclist
 Geneviève Bujold (born 1942), Canadian actress
 Geneviève Castrée (1981–2016), Canadian comics artist, illustrator, and musician
 Genevieve Chappell (born 1972), American television personality
 Geneviève Dulude-De Celles, Canadian film director
 Genevieve Feinstein (1913-2006), American mathematician, cryptanalyst, NSA Hall of Honor recipient
 Geneviève Gemayel (1908–2003), Lebanese political figure
 Genevieve Gorder (born 1974), American television host and interior designer
 Geneviève Hafner, French photographer based in New York City
 Genevieve Hannelius (born 1998), American teen actress
 Geneviève Lacambre (born 1937), French heritage curator
 Genevieve Morton (born 1986), South African model
 Genevieve Nnaji (born 1979), Nigerian actress
 Genevieve Padalecki (born 1981), American actress
 Geneviève Page (born 1927), French actress
 Genevieve Pezet (1913–2009), American-born French artist
 Genevieve Schatz, American singer
 Geneviève Simard (born 1980), Canadian alpine skier
 Genevieve M. Walton (1857–1932), American librarian
 Genevieve Westcott (1955–2020), New Zealand journalist and television presenter
 Genevieve Woo (born 1969), Singaporean television news presenter

Fictional characters
 Genevieve, a vintage car, title character of the British film Genevieve
 Genevieve, the dog in Madeline's Rescue by Ludwig Bemelmans
 Princess Genevieve, main protagonist in the animated film Barbie in the 12 Dancing Princesses
 Genevieve Atkinson in the American CBS soap opera The Young and the Restless
 Geneviève Emery in the French film Les Parapluies de Cherbourg, played by Catherine Deneuve
 Genevieve Selsor in the book The Martian Chronicles by Ray Bradbury
 Genevieve Villard in CrossGen Comics' Sigilverse
 Geneviève in the movie Rush Hour 3
"Sweet Lady Genevieve", a 1973 song by the Kinks
Genevieve from To All the Boys I've Loved Before by Jenny Han
 Genevieve Mirren-Carter, in the American TV show Brooklyn Nine-Nine
 Genevieve Helicopter on display in Air and Space Museum Bell Model 30 Ship 1A
 Genevieve Mercier from Seven Days in June by Tia Williams
Женевьева Терговен из романа Э. М. Ремарка "Чёрный обелиск"

See also
 Genovefa (disambiguation)
 Guinevere

References

English feminine given names
Given names